Claude Raffestin (born 15 September 1936 in Paris) is a Swiss geographer. He is professor of human geography at University of Geneva.

Raffestin's work primarily deals with territoriality and relies heavily on Michel Foucault’s work about power. His most influential book Pour une géographie du pouvoir has been translated into Spanish, Italian and (Brazilian) Portuguese.

Publications
 C. Raffestin. 2012. Space, Territory, and Territoriality. Environment and Planning D: Society and Space. 30(1):121-141. DOI:10.1068/d21311
"Territoriality - A Reflection of the Discrepancies Between the Organization of Space and Individual Liberty", International Political Science Review, Vol. 5, No. 2, 139-146 (1984). DOI 10.1177/019251218400500205
"Could Foucault have revolutionized Geography?", In: Space, Knowledge and Power, Chapter 14. Translated by Gerald Moore.
Pour une géographie du pouvoir, Librairies techniques, 1980 . (Italian: Per una geografia del potere, 1983; Portuguese: Por uma geografia do poder, 1993)
Géopolitique et histoire by Claude Raffestin, Dario Lopreno and Yvan Pasteur; Payot 1995. 
"L’actualité et Michel Foucault", espacestemps, 2005.
"Foucault aurait-il pu révolutionner la géographie?" In: Au risque de Foucault. Paris: Éditions du Centre Pompidou, 1997, pp. 141–149.

Further reading
 Francisco R. Klauser: Thinking through territoriality: introducing Claude Raffestin to Anglophone sociospatial theory, In: Environment and Planning D: Society and Space 30 (1), 2012, pp. 106 – 120.
 Juliet J. Fall: Reading Claude Raffestin: pathways for a critical biography. In: Environment and Planning D: Society and Space 30 (1), 2012, pp. 173 – 189.

References

Swiss geographers
French geographers
Living people
1936 births
Foucault scholars